Protobothrops jerdonii bourreti, commonly known as Bourret's pitviper, is a subspecies of venomous pit viper in the family Viperidae. The subspecies is endemic to Vietnam.

Etymology
The subspecific name, bourreti, is in honor of French herpetologist René Léon Bourret.

Description
The scalation of P. j. bourreti includes 21-23 rows of dorsal scales at midbody, 189-192 ventral scales, 65-72 subcaudal scales, and 7-8 supralabial scales.

Geographic range
P. j. bourreti is found in Northwestern Vietnam (in the provinces of Lào Cai and Lai Châu), and possibly also in adjacent China] (Yunnan). The type locality given is "Chapa" (Tonkin, Vietnam).

Taxonomy
The scientific name, P. j. bourreti (Klemmer, 1963), is a replacement name for Trimeresurus j. meridionalis Bourret, 1935.

See also
List of crotaline species and subspecies
Snakebite

References

Further reading
Bourret R (1935). "Notes herpétologiques sur l'Indochine français. No. IX. Les Serpents de Chapa ". Bull. Gén. Instr. Pub. Hanoi 5–17. (Trimeresurus jerdonii meridionalis, new subspecies, p. 14). (in French).
Klemmer K (1963). "Liste der rezenten Giftschlangen: Elapidae, Hydrophiidae, Viperidae und Crotalidae ". In: Elwert (1963). Die Giftschlangen der Erde. Wirkung und Antigenitat der Gifte Therapie von Giftschlangbissen. 464 pp. (Trimeresurus jerdonii bourreti, replacement name). (in German).

jerdonii bourreti